Diplodonta is a genus of bivalves belonging to the family Ungulinidae.

The genus has cosmopolitan distribution.

Species:

Diplodonta aleutica 
Diplodonta alta 
Diplodonta amboinensis 
Diplodonta annandalei 
Diplodonta balcombensis 
Diplodonta brocchii 
Diplodonta buwaldana 
Diplodonta chilkaensis 
Diplodonta collina 
Diplodonta cornea 
Diplodonta cretacea 
Diplodonta dilatata 
Diplodonta dissona 
Diplodonta enigmatica 
Diplodonta ferruginata 
Diplodonta gabbi 
Diplodonta guaraniana 
Diplodonta harfordi 
Diplodonta homalostriata 
Diplodonta hopkinsiensis 
Diplodonta insula 
Diplodonta insulsa 
Diplodonta intermedia 
Diplodonta lateralis 
Diplodonta minor 
Diplodonta nizeryi 
Diplodonta notata 
Diplodonta nucleiformis 
Diplodonta paralta 
Diplodonta patagonica 
Diplodonta planissima 
Diplodonta portesiana 
Diplodonta proxima 
Diplodonta punctata 
Diplodonta puncturella 
Diplodonta rosacea 
Diplodonta rotundata 
Diplodonta scalpta 
Diplodonta shilohensis 
Diplodonta subglobosa 
Diplodonta sublateralis 
Diplodonta subrotunda 
Diplodonta subrugosa 
Diplodonta thetis 
Diplodonta torelli 
Diplodonta transversaria 
Diplodonta trigonula 
Diplodonta undata 
Diplodonta ungulina 
Diplodonta woodringi

References

Ungulinidae
Bivalve genera